The Iamiaceae are a family of bacteria in the phylum Actinomycetota.

References 

Bacteria families
Actinomycetota